Carlo Caglieris (born 2 July 1951) is an Italian former basketball player. He competed in the men's tournament at the 1984 Summer Olympics. Caglieris is widely regarded as one of the greatest Italian point guards of his generation, having won three national championships with Virtus Bologna.

References

External links
 

1951 births
Living people
Italian men's basketball players
1978 FIBA World Championship players
Olympic basketball players of Italy
Basketball players at the 1984 Summer Olympics
Sportspeople from Brescia
20th-century Italian people